Kapilakshi Malhotra Indian film actress who made her debut with Tamil-language romantic film Prema Pipasi which was directed by Murali Ramaswamy and Malholtra played the love interest of co-star GPS. She has announced her debut in Bollywood.

Early life 
Kapilakshi was born in Indian state of Rajasthan's Jaipur City. Before venturing into acting, Malhotra was a theatre artist.

Filmography 

 Prema Pipasi

Reference links

External links 

 Kapilakshi Malhotra on Instagram

Indian film actresses
Living people
Actresses in Tamil cinema
21st-century Indian actresses
Year of birth missing (living people)